Number 13 is the second adaptation of a ghost story by M. R. James broadcast by the BBC in an ongoing revival of the A Ghost Story for Christmas tradition of the 1970s. Following A View from a Hill the previous year and preceding Whistle and I'll Come to You in 2010, the forty-minute film was first screened in December 2006 on BBC Four. The film was adapted by Justin Hopper from the short story, first published in Ghost Stories of an Antiquary in 1904.

The film stars Greg Wise as an academic lodging in room 12 of a drafty hotel in a small English cathedral town whilst assigned to authenticate papers which appear to date back to the Reformation. Having previously noticed that the hotel rooms jump from 12 to 14, after being awoken one night he is shocked to find the door to room number 13 has mysteriously appeared. He decides to investigate, with fearful consequences.

The cast also includes father-and-son actors David Burke and Tom Burke.

References

External links
 
 Ghost Stories for 2007 at bbc.co.uk.

Adaptations of works by M. R. James
Television films based on short fiction
British television films
A Ghost Story for Christmas